The 2000 Chrono des Herbiers was the 19th edition of the Chrono des Nations cycle race and was held on 22 October 2000. The race started and finished in Les Herbiers. The race was won by Jean Nuttli.

General classification

References

2000
2000 in road cycling
2000 in French sport
October 2000 sports events in France